Donald Alan Davis (born October 5, 1939) is an American writer, novelist and former war correspondent. He is a writer of military histories, military thrillers, and, along with Jack Coughlin, is co-author of the New York Times bestselling book, Shooter.

Books
Death Cruise (1996)
The Last Man on the Moon: Astronaut Eugene Cernan and America's Race in Space, with Eugene Cernan (1999)
Shooter: The Autobiography of the Top-Ranked Marine Sniper, with Jack Coughlin (2005)
Lightning Strike: The Secret Mission to Kill Admiral Yamamoto and Avenge Pearl Harbor (2005)
Stonewall Jackson: A Biography, foreword by Wesley K. Clark (2007)

Kyle Swanson sniper series 
In 2007, with St. Martin's Press, Coughlin and Davis began writing their ongoing military-thriller series featuring Marine protagonist Kyle Swanson.
Kill Zone (2007)
Dead Shot (2009)
Clean Kill (2010)
An Act of Treason (2011)
Running the Maze (2012)
Time to Kill (2013)
On Scope (2014)
Night of the Cobra (forthcoming, 2015)

References

Living people
1939 births
21st-century American novelists
American military historians
Place of birth missing (living people)
Writers from Savannah, Georgia
21st-century American non-fiction writers
Historians from Georgia (U.S. state)